The 2011–12 Loyola Greyhounds men's basketball team represented Loyola University Maryland during the 2011–12 NCAA Division I men's basketball season. The Greyhounds, led by eighth year head coach Jimmy Patsos, played their home games at Reitz Arena and are members of the Metro Atlantic Athletic Conference. They finished the season 24–9, 13–5 in MAAC play to finish in second place. They were champions of the MAAC Basketball tournament and earned the conference's automatic bid into the 2012 NCAA tournament where they lost in the second round to Ohio State.

Roster

Schedule

|-
!colspan=9| Exhibition

|-
!colspan=9| Regular season

|-
!colspan=9| 2012 MAAC men's basketball tournament

	
|-
!colspan=9| 2012 NCAA tournament

References

Loyola Greyhounds men's basketball seasons
Loyola
Loyola (MD)